Surab (Balochi,) is the district headquarters of Surab District, which was founded on 1 August 2017, when it was carved out of Kalat District. Surab District is famous for its orchards of apple and grapes.

The largest tribes in Surab District are Bangulzai , Reki, Mirwanis, Rodenis, Muhammad hassni, Harooni,Mullazai, Mardanshahi, Zehris, Mengal and other. Brahvi is the native language of the locals.

References

Populated places in Kalat District

Tehsils of Balochistan, Pakistan